The European Journal of Internal Medicine is a monthly peer reviewed medical journal that was established in 1989 and is published by Elsevier. It is an official journal of the European Federation of Internal Medicine, the Icelandic Society of Internal Medicine, the Irish Association of Internal Medicine, the Norwegian Society for Internal Medicine, and the Swedish Society of Internal Medicine, and is affiliated with the Polish Society of Internal Medicine and the Turkish Society of Internal Medicine. The journal covers all aspects of internal medicine.

Abstracting and indexing
The journal is abstracted and indexed in:

According to the Journal Citation Reports, the journal has a 2018 impact factor of 3.66.

References

External links

Internal medicine journals
Publications established in 1989
Monthly journals
English-language journals
Elsevier academic journals
Academic journals associated with international learned and professional societies of Europe